Cardston is a town in Alberta, Canada. It was first settled in 1887 by members of the Church of Jesus Christ of Latter-day Saints (LDS Church) who travelled from Utah, via the Macleod-Benton Trail, to present-day Alberta in one of the century's last wagon migrations. The founder of the town was Charles Ora Card. The combined church and school was completed by January 29 the year following their arrival.

History
Cardston has been "dry" (alcohol free) since at least the 1915 Alberta Liquor plebiscite, and there are no licensed premises in which to use video lottery terminals. In 1951, 75% of Cardston's 3500 residents were members of the LDS Church. It remains at about 80%, as of 2014.

On August 15, 2019, the town was granted a coat of arms by the Canadian Heraldic Authority.

Geography 
On its north side, it borders the Kainai Nation (Blood Tribe) Reserve, one of the largest reserves in North America.  to the west of Cardston are the Rocky Mountains of Waterton Lakes National Park.

Climate 

Cardston experiences a humid continental climate (Köppen climate classification Dfb). Along with the rest of southern Alberta, Cardston is subject to chinooks, which often bring temperatures in mid-winter well above . This same pattern results in more than 200 days of wind a year.

Weather records:
 Hottest Temperature:  on 23 July 2007
 Coldest Temperature:  on 28 January 1929
 Most Rain In One Day:  on 6 June 1995
 Most Snow In One Day:  on 4 May 1919
 Deepest Snow Cover:  on 29 April 1967

Demographics 

In the 2016 Census of Population conducted by Statistics Canada, the Town of Cardston recorded a population of 3,585 living in 1,175 of its 1,270 total private dwellings, a  change from its 2011 population of 3,580.

Source: Statistics Canada 2001 Census (numbers may not add up due to rounding)

Source: Statistics Canada 1996 & 2001 Census

Economy 
Cardston's primary industries are education, health care, entrepreneurship, agriculture, and tourism. Cardston is one of the few communities in Canada where alcohol cannot be sold or purchased. The Cardston Airport is located to the south-east of the town.

Attractions 

Cardston has a soccer park, ball parks, a golf course, an ice skating rink, a swimming pool, tennis courts, hiking trails, a skateboard park, several recreation parks, picnic areas and playgrounds. St. Mary's Dam reservoir northeast of Cardston supports water sports in the summer months.

The Cardston Alberta Temple was constructed by Latter-day Saint pioneers from 1913-1923, and was the first temple constructed by the Church outside of the United States. It remained the only temple in Canada until the Toronto Ontario Temple was built in 1990.

The Remington Carriage Museum is the largest collection of horse-drawn vehicles in North America, with more than 250 carriages, wagons and sleighs. The  facility features video displays, a fire hall, carriage factory, restoration shop, working stable, carriage rides, carriage rentals, a restaurant, guided tours, and a gift shop.

The Carriage House Theatre was constructed in 1912, and underwent renovations in 1937 and 1992. It seats 350 and hosts films, community theatre and professional summer theatre.

The Card Pioneer Home was built by Cardston's founder Charles Ora Card in 1887, and served as a community centre and stopping place for travellers until the first hotel was built in 1894. The log structure stands in its original location and is open for public visits.  It is as a registered provincial historic site.

The Courthouse Museum is a sandstone structure built in 1907 from stone quarried near Cardston. It was used longer than any other courthouse in Alberta. The building displays the judge's bench, witness box, and jail cells.  It is a registered provincial historic site.

Education 
Schools include the Cardston High School, the Cardston Jr. High School (formerly Eastridge Elementary School), and Cardston Elementary School which are all under the Westwind School Division.

Former schools include Leeside (grades 1 and 2 - torn down in the late 1980s to make way for the Remington-Alberta Carriage Centre) and Westside. The building that housed many of the junior high facilities, E.J. Wood School (including the gymnasium near the current high school), Parkland School, and John S. Smith Schools were torn down in 1993 as the junior high moved to the former Eastridge building. The Cardston High School underwent extensive renovations in the early 2000s, including an expansion to its gymnasium, much-improved fitness and weight room facilities, wider hallways, and a new cafeteria.

Media 
The Cardston News was first published in 1924, and was a weekly until 1925. During 1924–1925, the newspaper was edited and published by Fred Burton. It was later taken over by D.O. Wight, editor and managing director from September 17, 1925 until June 9, 1936. Fred Burton took over as publisher on June 16, 1936. The Cardston News was taken over by Gordon F. West On May 7, 1964.  The Cardston Record began publication on August 6, 1898, and was published weekly until September 1901.

Notable people 

 Victor L. Brown, world leader in the LDS Church
 Ben Cahoon, CFL slotback who won three Grey Cup championships with the Montreal Alouettes. 
 Grant Hunter, UCP MLA for Taber-Warner
 Elaine L. Jack, world leader in the LDS Church
 Merlin R. Lybbert, world leader in the LDS Church
 Shawna Molcak, basketball player who played for Canada in the 1996 Summer Olympics 
 Grant Strate, dancer and choreographer
 Edward J. Wood, leader in the LDS Church
 George Woolf, jockey
 Fay Wray, King Kong actress

See also 
Cardston (provincial electoral district)
Cardston-Chief Mountain
CFSO-TV
James Gladstone
List of communities in Alberta
List of towns in Alberta
Police Outpost Provincial Park

References

External links 

 
1887 establishments in the Northwest Territories
Cardston County
Latter-day Saint settlements in Canada
Towns in Alberta
1887 establishments in Alberta